"Promises" is a song by Scottish DJ and record producer Calvin Harris and English singer-songwriter Sam Smith. Both artists co-wrote the song with Canadian singer-songwriter Jessie Reyez, who also provided additional vocals to the song. The song's production was handled solely by Harris. It was released by Columbia Records and Sony Music on 17 August 2018. It reached number one on the UK Singles Chart on 7 September 2018, having debuted at number four two weeks earlier. It became Harris' tenth British chart-topper and Smith's seventh. In the United States, the single became Harris' twelfth and Smith's first number-one on Billboards Dance/Mix Show Airplay Chart in its 6 October 2018 issue. The song appears on Smith's third studio album Love Goes (2020).

Release
Both artists announced the song via Twitter on 13 August 2018. "Very excited about this one", Harris wrote. Smith added: "Surprise! I'm so excited for you all to hear this song." The announcement was accompanied by a Japanese-inspired retro single artwork, which depicts a lone tree rising up in front of the ocean against a faded pink backdrop. The song marks Smith's third foray into electronic dance music, after being featured on Disclosure's singles "Latch" and "Omen" in 2012 and 2015, respectively. On 15 August, Smith posted a promotional photo on Twitter ahead of the single's release, showing them and Harris relaxing on a rooftop while sharing a bottle of wine and a pizza. The single was released alongside a lyric video.

Composition
"Promises" is a house and dance-pop song recorded in the key of D minor with a tempo of 123 beats per minute in common time. It follows a chord progression of Bmaj7–Dm7–Csus2, and Smith's vocals span from C3 to A4.

Critical reception
Brandy Robidoux of Hollywood Life called the song "a music match made in heaven", writing that Smith's "smooth vocals" provides a "soulful vibe", while retaining the "classic Calvin thumping beat".

Music video
The music video for "Promises" was released on 4 September, directed by Emil Nava, and it honors the LGBT community with references to the ball scene and voguing.

Track listing

 Digital download
 "Promises" – 3:33
 12-inch single
Side A: "Promises" – 3:33
Side B: "Promises" (extended mix) – 8:27
 Digital download – remixes
"Promises" (David Guetta remix) – 3:10
"Promises" (MK remix) – 4:19
"Promises" (Sonny Fodera remix) – 3:57
"Promises" (Illyus & Barrientos remix) – 4:42
"Promises" (Franky Rizardo remix) – 4:26
"Promises" (Mousse T.'s Disco Shizzle remix) – 3:30
"Promises" (Offaiah remix) – 3:09
"Promises" (Sonny Fodera Disco mix) – 3:57
 Digital download – extended remixes
"Promises" (David Guetta extended remix) – 7:53
"Promises" (MK extended remix) – 8:01
"Promises" (Sonny Fodera extended remix) – 6:19
"Promises" (Illyus & Barrientos extended remix) – 6:00
"Promises" (Franky Rizardo extended remix) – 7:13
"Promises" (Mousse T.'s extended Disco Shizzle remix) – 6:26
"Promises" (Offaiah extended remix) – 7:02
"Promises" (Sonny Fodera extended disco mix) – 7:05
"Promises" (extended mix) – 8:27

Personnel
Credits adapted from Tidal.
 Calvin Harris – production, mix engineering, record engineering
 Sam Smith – vocals
 Jessie Reyez – vocals
 Mike Marsh – master engineering

Charts

Weekly charts

Year-end charts

Certifications

Release history

References

External links
 

2018 singles
2018 songs
Calvin Harris songs
Columbia Records singles
Irish Singles Chart number-one singles
Number-one singles in Iceland
Number-one singles in Israel
Number-one singles in Poland
Number-one singles in Scotland
Sam Smith (singer) songs
Songs written by Calvin Harris
Songs written by Jessie Reyez
Songs written by Sam Smith (singer)
Sony Music singles
Ultratop 50 Singles (Flanders) number-one singles
UK Singles Chart number-one singles